Irina Orendi was a Romanian athlete. She competed in the women's high jump at the 1928 Summer Olympics.

References

External links
 

Year of birth missing
Possibly living people
Athletes (track and field) at the 1928 Summer Olympics
Romanian female high jumpers
Olympic athletes of Romania
Place of birth missing